Particle technology is the "science and technology related to the handling and processing of particles and powders." This applies to the production, handling, modification, and use of a wide variety of particulate materials, both wet or dry, in sizes ranging from nanometers to centimeters; its scope spans a range of industries to include chemical, petrochemical, agricultural, food, pharmaceuticals, mineral processing, civil engineering, advanced materials, energy, and the environment.

Subjects of particle technology
Particle technology thus deals with:
the behavior of solids in bulk, including soil mechanics, bulk material handling, silos, conveying, powder metallurgy, nanotechnology;
size reduction including crushing and grinding;
increasing size by flocculation, granulation, powder compaction, tableting, crystallization
particle separation, such as sieving, tabling, flotation, magnetic separation, and/or electrostatic precipitation, fluidization, Centrifugal separation, Liquid filtration;
analytical procedures such as particle size analysis.

Particle characterization
Particles are characterized by their individual size and shape, and by the distribution of these properties in bulk quantities.  The space between particles in bulk means that the bulk density is less than the density of individual particles.  The way in which they move over each other or lock together determines stability or flowability, which is tested by the triaxial shear test.

References

Further reading